The newly elected Chairman of Ejigbo LCDA is Hon. Monsuru Oloyede Bello (Obe). He was elected in July 2017. There are six (6) wards in Ejigbo LCDA: Aigbaka, Ailegun, Fadu, Ifoshi, Ilamose and Oke-Afa ward.  
Ejigbo-Lagos is a suburb of the city of Lagos, in Lagos State, Nigeria a Local Council Development Area (LCDA) within the Oshodi-Isolo local government area.
In 2009, the Executive Chairman was the Hon. Kehinde Bamigbetan.

References

External links

Local Government Areas in Lagos State